This article is a list of topics in Chinese mythology. Chinese mythology is mythology that has been passed down in oral form or recorded in literature from the area now known as China. Chinese mythology includes many varied myths from regional and cultural traditions. Chinese mythology is far from monolithic, not being an integrated system, even among Han people. Chinese mythology is encountered in the traditions of various classes of  people, their Huaxia predecessors, Tibetan mythology, Turkic mythology, Korean mythology, and many others. However, the study of Chinese mythology tends to focus upon material in the Chinese language. Much of the mythology involves exciting stories full of fantastic people and beings, the use of magical powers, often taking place in an exotic mythological place or time.

Like many mythologies, Chinese mythology has in the past been believed to be, at least in part, a factual recording of history. Along with Chinese folklore, Chinese mythology forms an  important part of Chinese folk religion (Yang et al 2005, 4). Many stories regarding characters and events of the distant past have a double tradition: ones which present a more historicized or euhemerized version and ones which presents a more mythological version (Yang et al 2005, 12–13). Many myths involve the creation and cosmology of the universe and its deities and inhabitants. Some mythology involves creation myths, the origin of things, people and culture. Some involve the origin of the Chinese state. Some myths present a chronology of prehistoric times, many of these involve a culture hero who taught people how to build houses, or cook, or write, or was the ancestor of an ethnic group or dynastic family. Mythology is intimately related to ritual. Many myths are oral associations with ritual acts, such as dances, ceremonies, and sacrifices.

Major sources and concepts

Shanhaijing, or Classic of Mountains and Seas 
shenmo genre of vernacular fiction revolve around gods and monsters. Important mythological fiction, seen as definitive records of these myths, include:
 Verse poetry associated with the ancient state of Chu such as "Lisao", "Jiu Ge", and "Heavenly Questions", contained in the Chuci anthology, traditionally attributed to the authorship of Qu Yuan of Chu
 Fengshen Bang (Investiture of the Gods), a mythological fiction dealing with the founding of the Zhou dynasty
 Journey to the West attributed to Wu Cheng'en, published in the 1590s; a fictionalized account of the pilgrimage of Xuanzang to India to obtain Buddhist religious texts in which the main character encounters ghosts, monsters, and demons, as well as the Flaming Mountains
 Baishe Zhuan, a romantic tale set in Hangzhou involving a female snake who attained human form and fell in love with a man

Presiding deities 
The concept of a principal or presiding deity has fluctuated over time in Chinese mythology. Examples include:
Shangdi, also sometimes Huángtiān Dàdì (皇天大帝), appeared as early as the Shang dynasty. In later eras, he was more commonly referred to as Huángtiān Shàngdì (皇天上帝). The use of Huángtiān Dàdì refers to the Jade Emperor and Tian.
Yu Di (the Jade Emperor) appeared in literature after the establishment of Taoism in China; his appearance as Yu Huang dates back to beyond the times of Yellow Emperor, Nüwa, or Fuxi.
Tian (Heaven) appeared in literature c.700 BCE, possibly earlier as dating depends on the date of the Shujing (Book of Documents). There are no creation-oriented narratives for Tian. The qualities of Tian and Shangdi appear to have merged in later literature and are now worshiped as one entity ("皇天上帝", Huángtiān Shàngdì) in, for example, the Beijing's Temple of Heaven.
Nüwa (also referred to as Nü Kwa) appeared in literature no earlier than c.350 BCE. Her companion, Fuxi, (also called Fu Hsi) was her brother and husband. They are sometimes worshiped as the ultimate ancestor of all humankind, and are often represented as half-snake, half-human. It is sometimes believed that Nüwa molded human beings from clay for companionship. She repaired the sky after Gong Gong had damaged the pillar supporting the heavens.
Pangu, written about by Taoist author Xu Zheng c.200 CE, was claimed to be the first sentient being and creator, “making the heavens and the earth.”

Time periods

Three August Ones and Five Emperors 

During or following the age of Nüwa and Fuxi came the age of the Three August Ones and Five Emperors. These legendary rulers ruled between c.2850 BCE to 2205 BCE, before the Xia dynasty. These rulers are generally regarded as morally upright and benevolent, examples to be emulated by latter-day kings and emperors. The list of names comprising the Three August Ones and Five Emperors vary widely among sources. One widely circulated and popular version is:

The Three August Ones (Huáng)
Fuxi: companion of Nüwa
Yellow Emperor ("Huang Emperor"): often regarded as the first sovereign of the Chinese nation
Shennong ("Divine Farmer"): reputedly taught the ancients agriculture and medicine
The Five Emperors (Dì)
Shaohao: leader of the Dongyi (Eastern Barbarians); his pyramidal tomb is in present-day Shandong
Zhuanxu: grandson of the Huang Emperor.
Emperor Ku: great-grandson of the Huang Emperor and nephew of Zhuanxu.
Yao: son of Ku; Yao's elder brother succeeded Ku, but he abdicated when found to be an ineffective ruler.
Shun: the successor of Yao, who passed over his own son and made Shun his successor because of Shun's ability and morality.

Great Flood 

Yu the Great
Yellow River
Yao
Gun

Important deities and mythological figures 
 Deities with Buddhist appellations
Dizang: ruler of the ten hells
Four Heavenly Kings: four Buddhist guardian gods
Gautama Buddha (釋迦牟尼, Shìjiā móu ní)
Guanyin (also Kuanyin): bodhisattva associated with compassion
Laughing Buddha
Baosheng Dadi: god of medicine
 Cangjie: had four eyes, invented Chinese characters
Chang'e: moon goddess
Chiyou: the tyrant who fought against the then-future Yellow Emperor
 City god
Da Yu (Yu the Great): founder of the Xia dynasty famed for his introduction of flood control and upright moral character
Daoji: compassionate folk hero known for wild and eccentric behaviour 
 Dragon King
Eight Immortals
 Cao Guojiu
 Han Xiangzi
 Han Zhongli
 He Xiangu
 Lan Caihe
 Lü Dongbin
 Li Tieguai
 Zhang Guolao
Erlang Shen: possessed a third eye in the middle of his forehead that saw the truth
 Four Heavenly Ministers: heavenly kings of Taoist religion
 Jade Emperor
 Zi Wei Emperor
 Great Emperor of Polaris
 Houtu
 Fangfeng: the giant who helped fight flood, executed by Yu the Great
 Feng Meng: apprentice to Hou Yi, and his eventual murderer 
Gao Yao
Gong Gong: water god/sea monster resembling a serpent or dragon
Guan Yu: god of brotherhoods, martial power, and war
 Hànbá (旱魃)
Houyi: archery deity; married to Chang'e, a moon goddess
Kua Fu: a giant who wanted to capture the sun
Kui Xing: god of examinations and an associate of the god of literature, Wen Chang
Lei Gong: god of thunder
Lung Mo: Chinese woman who became a goddess after raising five infant dragons
Magu (deity): Daoist immortal, "Auntie Hemp"
Mazu: goddess of the sea
Meng Po: responsible for reincarnated souls forgetting previous lives
Nezha: Taoist protection deity
Nüwa: creator of humans
Pangu: a deity that separated heaven and earth
Siming: god of lifespan and fate
Sun Wukong (also known as the Monkey King): protects mankind from demons and evil spirits
Tam Kung: sea deity with the ability to forecast weather
The Cowherd and Weaver Girl
Three August Ones and Five Emperors: a collection of legendary rulers
Three Pure Ones: the Taoist trinity
 Daode Tianzun
 Lingbao Tianzun
 Yuanshi Tianzun
Tu Di Gong: god of wealth and merit
Tu Er Shen: managed the love and sex between homosexual men
Wenchang Wang: god of culture and literature
Wong Tai Sin: possessed healing power
Wu Gang: endlessly cut down a self-healing bay laurel on the moon
Xi Wangmu: Queen Mother of the West
Xiang River goddesses (Xiangfei)
É huáng (娥皇)
 Nǚ yīng (女英).
Xihe, goddess of the sun
Xingtian: headless giant decapitated by the Yellow Emperor as punishment for challenging him; his face is on his torso as he has no head
Yanluowang: God of death
Yuqiang: Yellow Emperor's descendant, god of north sea and wind
Zao Jun: kitchen god
Zhao Gongming (also Cai Shen): god of prosperity
Zhong Kui: vanquisher of ghosts and evil beings
Zhurong: god of fire

Cosmology

Directional
The Four Symbols of Chinese cosmology
 Azure Dragon: east
 Black Tortoise: north
 White Tiger: west
 Vermillion Bird: south

Mythological places

 Mount Buzhou (不周山): mythical mountain, generally considered to be one of the eight mountain pillars supporting the sky above the world (China). Damage by Gong Gong was thought to have caused China/the world to slant to the southeast, and thus the rivers to flow in that direction, and also displacing the Celestial Pole.
 Diyu: hell, the subterranean land inhabited by souls of dead humans and various supernatural beings.
 Eight Pillars: pillars between Earth and Heaven, supporting the sky.
 Feather Mountain: a place of exile during or just after the world flood
 Fusang: a mythical island interpreted to be Japan
 Heaven: an elaborate place up in the sky, the abode of the god (or God) Tian (also meaning "Heaven), also the home destination of various deities, divinities, shamans, and many more.
 Jade Mountain, a mythological mountain
 Kunlun Mountain: a mythical mountain, dwelling of various divinities, and fabulous plants and animals (there is also a real Kunlun Mountain or range).
 Longmen: dragon gate where carp can transform into dragons
 Mount Penglai: paradise; a fabled fairy isle on the China Sea
 Moving Sands: a semi-mythological place to the west of China (the real Taklamakan Desert to the west of or in China is known for its shifting sands). 
 Red River: the mythological river in the west, near Kunlun
 Queqiao (鵲橋; Quèqiáo): bridge formed by birds flying across the Milky Way
 Tiantang: heaven
 Weak River: the mythological river in the west, near Kunlun, too light in specific gravity for floating or swimming
 Xuanpu (玄圃; Xuánpǔ): a mythical fairyland on Kunlun Mountain
 Yaochi (瑤池; Yáochí): the abode of immortals where the Queen Mother of the West lives.
 Yellow Springs: (see Diyu)
 Youdu: the capital city of Di Yu, likewise under the ground

Concepts
Cords of the Sky
Sky Ladder/Pillars of the Earth

Mythical creatures

Abstract
Zhulong: the torch dragon, a solar deity
The Four Fiends (四凶, Sì xiōng):
Hundun: chaos
Taotie: gluttony
Táowù (梼杌): ignorance; provided confusion and apathy and made mortals free of the curiosity and reason needed to reach enlightenment
Qióngqí (窮奇): deviousness

Birds
Sanzuwu (三足烏; sānzúwū): three-legged crow that represented the sun birds shot down by Houyi
Qing Niao (青鳥; qīngniâo): mythical bird and messenger of Xi Wangmu
Fenghuang (鳳凰; fènghuáng): Chinese mythical bird, sometimes translated as "Phoenix"
Bi Fang bird (畢方), a one-legged bird.
Crane: linked with immortality, may be transformed xian
Jiān/biyiniao (鶼/比翼鸟): a mythical bird with two heads, one male, one female. They have only one pair of wings, and they are inseparable. In the poem Chang Hen Ge(长恨歌), the emperor mourns for his dead lover, and states that he would be a biyiniao and stay with her forever. 
Jiguang (吉光; jíguāng)
Jingwei: the mythical bird which tried to fill up the ocean with twigs and pebbles
Jiufeng: nine-headed bird used to scare children
Peng (鵬/鹏): giant mythical bird
Shang-Yang (商羊): a rainbird
Sù Shuāng (鷫鷞; su4shuang3): mythical bird like a crane; described as a water bird
Vermilion Bird (朱雀): the icon of the south, sometimes confused with the Fenghuang
Zhen: poisonous bird
Lúan (鸾): mythical bird related to phoenix

Dragons

Chi (螭): hornless dragon or mountain demon
Dilong (地龍/地龙): the earth dragon
Dragon King (various): one of the various kings – dragons ruling other dragons and often aquatic beings in general.
Fuzanglong (伏藏龍/伏藏龙): the treasure dragon
Jiaolong (蛟龍/蛟龙): dragon of floods and sea
Shenlong (神龍/神龙): the rain dragon
Teng (螣): a flying creature, sometimes considered a type of snake or dragon-snake
Tianlong (天龍/天龙): the celestial dragon, sometimes associated with centipede qualities
Yinglong (應龍/应龙): the water dragon, a powerful servant of Yellow Emperor
Zhulong (烛龙/燭龍): the luminous red celestial "torch dragon" (only part-dragon)

Fishlike

 Mermaid (人魚)
 Kun (also Peng): giant monstrous fish form of the Peng bird.

Humanoid
Kui: one-legged mountain demon or dragon who invented music and dance; also Shun's musical master
 Jiangshi: a reanimated corpse
 Ox-Head and Horse-Face
 Xiāo (魈; xiao1): mountain spirit or demon
 Yaoguai: cultivated creatures or demoted gods

Mammalian

 Jiuwei Hu (九尾狐): Nine-tailed Fox
 Nian: lives under the sea or in mountains; attacks children
Longma: winged horse similar to the Qilin
 Luduan: can detect the truth
Xiezhi (also Xie Cai): the creature of justice said to be able to distinguish lies from truths; it had a long, straight horn used to gore liars
 Qilin: chimeric animal with several variations. The first giraffe sent as a gift to a Chinese emperor was believed to be the Qilin; an early Chinese painting depicts this giraffe replete with the fish scales of the Qilin. Qilin was believed to show perfect good will, gentleness, and benevolence to all righteous creatures.
 Pixiu: resembled a winged lion
 Rui Shi (瑞獅, Ruì Shī): guardian lions
 Huli jing: fox spirits
Xīniú (犀牛): a rhinoceros; became mythologized when rhinoceroses became extinct in China. Depictions later changed to a more bovine appearance, with a short, curved horn on its head used to communicate with the sky
Bai Ze: legendary creature said to have been encountered by the Yellow Emperor and to have given him a compendium listing all the demons in the world
Dēnglóng / Hǒu (蹬龙/犼) : legendary creature worshipped as the greatest creature in China because it helps to drive away evil from its master, defend against ill-meaning wishes, takes away bad fortune, gathers and guards money.

Simian

 Chinese Monkey: warded off evil spirits; highly respected and loved

Xiao (mythology), described as a long-armed ape or a four-winged bird

Snakelike and reptilian

 Ao: a giant marine turtle or tortoise 
 Bashe: a snake reputed to swallow elephants
 Xiangliu: nine-headed snake monster
 White Serpent

Mythical plants 
 Fusang: a world tree, home of sun(s)
 Lingzhi mushroom: legendary fungus of immortality
 Peaches of Immortality: legendary peaches of immortality
 Yao Grass: grass with magical properties

Mythical substances 
 Xirang: the flood-fighting expanding earth

Literature 
Imperial historical documents and Confucian canons such as Records of the Grand Historian, Lüshi Chunqiu, Book of Rites], and Classic History
In Search of the Supernatural: 4th-century compilation of stories and hearsay concerning spirits, ghosts, and supernatural phenomena
Strange Tales from a Chinese Studio, by Pu Songling, with many stories of fox spirits
Zhiguai (誌怪): literary genre that deals with strange (mostly supernatural) events and stories
Zi Bu Yu: a collection of supernatural stories compiled during the Qing dynasty

Miscellaneous 
Agriculture in Chinese mythology
Ba gua
Bovidae in Chinese mythology
Celestial bureaucracy
Chinese astrology
Chinese creation myth
Chinese folk religion
Chinese folklore
Chinese legendary creatures
Chinese mythology in popular culture
Chinese spiritual world concepts
Dog in Chinese mythology
Fish in Chinese mythology
Fuxi
Geese in Chinese poetry
Great Flood (China)
Guanyin
Horse in Chinese mythology
Huangdi, the Yellow Emperor
I Ching
Imperial examination in Chinese mythology
List of deities
Nüwa
Panhu
Sanxing (deities)
Simians (Chinese poetry)
Teng
Yuan Ke

See also
 List of Legendary Animals from China
 Chinese gods and immortals

References

Citations

Sources 

 Barrett, T. H. 2008. The Woman Who Discovered Printing. New Haven: Yale University Press. 
 Christie, Anthony (1968). Chinese Mythology. Feltham: Hamlyn Publishing. 
 Hawkes, David, translator and introduction (2011 [1985]). Qu Yuan et al., The Songs of the South: An Ancient Chinese Anthology of Poems by Qu Yuan and Other Poets. London: Penguin Books. 
 
 Paludan, Ann (1998). Chronicle of the Chinese Emperors: The Reign-by-Reign Record of the Rulers of Imperial China. New York, New York: Thames and Hudson. 
 Latourette, Kenneth Scott The Chinese: Their History and Culture (Third Edition, Revised), 1947. New York: Macmillan.
 Schafer, Edward H. (1963) The Golden Peaches of Samarkand. Berkeley: University of California Press.
 Sheppard, Odell. 1930. The Lore of the Unicorn – Myths and Legends.
 
 Werner, E. T. C. (1994 [1922]). Myths and Legends of China. New York: Dover Publications. 
 Wu, K. C. (1982). The Chinese Heritage. New York: Crown Publishers. .
Yang, Lihui and Deming An, with Jessica Anderson Turner (2005). Handbook of Chinese Mythology. New York: Oxford University Press. 

Sino-Tibetan mythology